The Ntempriz Bridge, also known as Strefeiko Gefyri, is an arch bridge situated in Messinia, approximately 1 km west of Strefi village crossing the canyon where Velikas river runs through. A few hundred meters southeast of the bridge there are the remains of Ntepriz castle which lies on a hill and its residents probably were primary users of the bridge. It was built during the Francocracy period in Greece, to connect Pylos with Messini broader areas.

Description
Made of limestone stones and having just enough width for a carriage, it is arched with two spans, a large main arched span with a slight obtuse angle that accommodates most of the river discharge and a secondary triangular much smaller one on side of the river it crosses. In the past a watermill used to be situated at its exit.

Date
While most sources agree that the bridge was built during Francocracy, there hasn’t been conducted enough research for a more precise date to be estimated. Nevertheless, it is considered to be one of oldest bridges in Messinia.

Gallery

See also
 List of bridges in Greece

References

Bridges in Peloponnese (region)
Frankokratia
Arch bridges in Greece